Darwin Plateau is a mostly circular, small plateau, about 0.75 mi to 1.25 miles in diameter surrounding the base of Mount Huethawali; the Huethawali prominence occupies about one quarter of the Darwin Plateau. South of the prominence, the Darwin Plateau borders Huethawali on the southwest, south, and southeast, with the southwest forming a saddle between Garnet Canyon (Upper Canyon, and the northeast of Drummond Plateau), the southwest terminus of the Grand Scenic Divide, and east, the saddle at the headwaters of the southwest terminus of Upper Bass Canyon (the location of the South Bass Trail).

The Darwin Plateau is about 0.75 miles northwest of the southwest terminus of the Grand Scenic Divide, and is located about 2.0 miles east of excursions of the Colorado River.

North of Mount Huethawali are two landforms identical in approximate elevations to Darwin Plateau, namely Spencer Terrace, north-northwest, and Huxley Terrace, northeast (the west border of the Grand Scenic Divide, across Upper Bass Canyon). Spencer and Huxley Terrace's, and the Darwin Plateau, are composed of unit 4 of 4 of the Supai Group, the cliff-former, (and platform-former), Esplanade Sandstone. (Trail guides, (for example from Grand Canyon trip reports,) refer to the trails being on “the Esplanade”); The Esplanade (Grand Canyon) is a large platform across from Toroweap Overlook, downstream, and on the South Rim.

See also
 Geology of the Grand Canyon area
 Grand Scenic Divide
 Wallace Butte

References

External links

 Royal Arch Loop from saddle of Darwin Plateau

Plateaus of Arizona
Grand Canyon
Grand Canyon National Park
Grand Canyon, South Rim
Grand Canyon, South Rim (west)